The 1964 Kensington and Chelsea Council election took place on 7 May 1964 to elect members of Kensington and Chelsea London Borough Council in London, England. The whole council was up for election and the Conservative party gained control of the council.

Background
These elections were the first to the newly formed borough. Previously elections had taken place in the Metropolitan Borough of Chelsea and Metropolitan Borough of Kensington. These boroughs were joined to form the new London Borough of Kensington and Chelsea by the London Government Act 1963.

A total of 168 candidates stood in the election for the 60 seats being contested across 15 wards. These included a full slate from the Conservative party, while the Labour and Liberal parties stood 59 and 42 respectively. Other candidates included 7 from the Communist party. There were 4 six-seat wards, 4 two-seat wards, 3 four-seat wards, 3 three-seat wards and 1 seven-seat ward.

This election had aldermen as well as directly elected councillors.  The Conservatives got 8 aldermen and Labour 2.

The Council was elected in 1964 as a "shadow authority" but did not start operations until 1 April 1965.

Election result
The results saw the Conservatives gain the new council with a majority of 32 after winning 46 of the 60 seats. Overall turnout in the election was 25.5%. This turnout included 626 postal votes.

Ward results

Labour nominee A. J. Kazantzis was rejected because one of his assenting signatories had signed the nomination papers of Mr. Banner-Stone and Mr. Dutch.

References

1964
Kensington and Chelsea
20th century in the Royal Borough of Kensington and Chelsea